The following outline is provided as an overview of and topical guide to the U.S. state of Oklahoma:

Oklahoma – state located in the South Central United States. Oklahoma is the 20th most extensive and the 28th most populous of the 50 United States. The state's name is derived from the Choctaw words okla and humma, meaning "red people".  On November 16, 1907, Oklahoma became the 46th state to enter the union. Its residents are known as Oklahomans or, informally "Okies", and its capital and largest city is Oklahoma City. A major producer of natural gas, oil, and agricultural products, Oklahoma relies on an economic base of aviation, energy, telecommunications, and biotechnology.

General reference 

 Names
 Common name: Oklahoma
 Pronunciation: 
 Official name: State of Oklahoma
 Abbreviations and name codes
 Postal symbol:  OK
 ISO 3166-2 code:  US-OK
 Internet second-level domain:  .ok.us
 Nicknames
Native America (currently used on license plates)
 Land of the Red Man
 Sooner State 
 Adjectival: Oklahoma
 Demonyms:
 Oklahoman
 Sooner (historic)
 Boomer (historic)
 Okie (archaic)

Geography of Oklahoma 

Geography of Oklahoma
 Oklahoma is: a U.S. state, a federal state of the United States of America
 Location
 Northern hemisphere
 Western hemisphere
 Americas
 North America
 Anglo America
 Northern America
 United States of America
 Contiguous United States
 Western United States
 Southwestern United States
 Southern United States
 South Central United States
 Population of Oklahoma: 3,751,351  (2010 U.S. Census)
 Area of Oklahoma:
 Atlas of Oklahoma

Places in Oklahoma 

 Historic places in Oklahoma
 Abandoned communities in Oklahoma
 Ghost towns in Oklahoma
 National Historic Landmarks in Oklahoma
 National Register of Historic Places listings in Oklahoma
 Bridges on the National Register of Historic Places in Oklahoma
 National Natural Landmarks in Oklahoma
 National parks in Oklahoma
 State parks in Oklahoma

Environment of Oklahoma 

 Climate of Oklahoma
 Geology of Oklahoma
 Superfund sites in Oklahoma
 Wildlife of Oklahoma
 Fauna of Oklahoma
 Birds of Oklahoma
 Reptiles
 Snakes of Oklahoma

Natural geographic features of Oklahoma 

 Lakes of Oklahoma
 Rivers of Oklahoma

Regions of Oklahoma 

 Central Oklahoma
 Eastern Oklahoma
 Northern Oklahoma
 Northeastern Oklahoma
 Northwestern Oklahoma
 Southern Oklahoma
 Southeastern Oklahoma
 Southwestern Oklahoma
 Western Oklahoma

Administrative divisions of Oklahoma 

 The 77 counties of the state of Oklahoma
 Municipalities in Oklahoma
 Cities in Oklahoma
 State capital of Oklahoma: Oklahoma City
 City nicknames in Oklahoma
 Towns in Oklahoma
 Unincorporated communities in Oklahoma
 Census-designated places in Oklahoma

Demography of Oklahoma 

Demographics of Oklahoma

Government and politics of Oklahoma 

Politics of Oklahoma
 Form of government: U.S. state government
 United States congressional delegations from Oklahoma
 Oklahoma State Capitol
 Elections in Oklahoma
 Political party strength in Oklahoma

Branches of the government of Oklahoma 

Government of Oklahoma

Executive branch of the government of Oklahoma 
 Governor of Oklahoma
 Lieutenant Governor of Oklahoma
 Secretary of State of Oklahoma
 State Treasurer of Oklahoma
 State departments
 Oklahoma Department of Transportation

Legislative branch of the government of Oklahoma 

 Oklahoma Legislature (bicameral)
 Upper house: Oklahoma Senate
 Lower house: Oklahoma House of Representatives

Judicial branch of the government of Oklahoma 

Courts of Oklahoma
 Supreme Court of Oklahoma

Law and order in Oklahoma 

Law of Oklahoma
 Cannabis in Oklahoma
 Capital punishment in Oklahoma
 Individuals executed in Oklahoma
 Constitution of Oklahoma
 Crime in Oklahoma
 Gun laws in Oklahoma
 Law enforcement in Oklahoma
 Law enforcement agencies in Oklahoma
 Oklahoma Highway Patrol

Military in Oklahoma 

 Oklahoma Air National Guard
 Oklahoma Army National Guard

History of Oklahoma 

History of Oklahoma

History of Oklahoma, by period 
Indigenous peoples
Spanish colony of Santa Fé de Nuevo Méjico, 1598–1821
French colony of Louisiane, 1699–1764
Treaty of Fontainebleau of 1762
Spanish (though predominantly Francophone) district of Alta Luisiana, 1764–1803
Third Treaty of San Ildefonso of 1800
French district of Haute-Louisiane, 1803
Louisiana Purchase of 1803
Unorganized U.S. territory created by the Louisiana Purchase, 1803–1804
District of Louisiana, 1804–1805
Territory of Louisiana, 1805–1812
Territory of Missouri, (1812–1819)–1821
War of 1812, June 18, 1812 – March 23, 1815
Treaty of Ghent, December 24, 1814
Adams–Onis Treaty of 1819
Territory of Arkansaw, (1819–1828)–1836
Mexican territory of Santa Fé de Nuevo México, 1821–1848
Cimarron Cutoff of the Santa Fe Trail, 1826–1880
Mexican–American War, 1846–1848
Treaty of Guadalupe Hidalgo of 1848
Indian territory, 1824–1907
Indian Removal Act of 1830
Trail of Tears, 1830–1838
Indian Intercourse Act of 1834
Quapaw Indian Agency administered lands 1836–1890
Mexican–American War, April 25, 1846 – February 2, 1848
Treaty of Guadalupe Hidalgo, February 2, 1848
American Civil War, April 12, 1861 – May 13, 1865
Indian territory in the American Civil War
Border territory, 1861–1865
Price's Raid, September 27 – December 2, 1864
Southern Treaty Commission, 1865–1869
Dawes Act, February 8, 1887
No Man's Land, 1848–1890
Compromise of 1850
Comanche Campaign, 1868–1874
Cimarron Territory, 1886–1890
Unassigned Lands 1862–1890
Oklahoma Organic Act, 1890
Territory of Oklahoma, 1890–1907
Spanish–American War, April 25 – August 12, 1898
Enabling Act of 1906 providing conditions for Oklahoma Statehood
State of Oklahoma becomes 46th state admitted to the United States of America on November 16, 1907
Oklahoma City bombing, April 19, 1995

History of Oklahoma, by region 

 By city
 History of Lawton, Oklahoma
 History of Oklahoma City
 History of Tulsa, Oklahoma
 By county
 History of Adair County, Oklahoma
 History of Beckham County, Oklahoma
 History of Cotton County, Oklahoma
 History of Custer County, Oklahoma
 History of Grant County, Oklahoma
 History of Greer County, Oklahoma
 History of Harmon County, Oklahoma
 History of Jackson County, Oklahoma
 History of Oklahoma County, Oklahoma
 History of Okmulgee County, Oklahoma
 History of Pittsburg County, Oklahoma
 History of Pushmataha County, Oklahoma
 History of Roger Mills County, Oklahoma
 History of Sequoyah County, Oklahoma
 Other
 History of the Oklahoma Panhandle

History of Oklahoma, by subject 

 History of the Oklahoma Constitution
 History of the Oklahoma State Capitol
 History of the University of Oklahoma

Culture of Oklahoma 

Culture of Oklahoma
 Museums in Oklahoma
 Religion in Oklahoma
 The Church of Jesus Christ of Latter-day Saints in Oklahoma
 Episcopal Diocese of Oklahoma
 Scouting in Oklahoma
 State symbols of Oklahoma
 Flag of the state of Oklahoma 
 Great Seal of the State of Oklahoma

The arts in Oklahoma 
 Music of Oklahoma

Sports in Oklahoma 

Sports in Oklahoma

Economy and infrastructure of Oklahoma 

Economy of Oklahoma
 Communications in Oklahoma
 Newspapers in Oklahoma
 Radio stations in Oklahoma
 Television stations in Oklahoma
 Health care in Oklahoma
 Hospitals in Oklahoma
 Transportation in Oklahoma
 Airports in Oklahoma
 Former Indian Reservations in Oklahoma

Education in Oklahoma 

Education in Oklahoma
 Schools in Oklahoma
 School districts in Oklahoma
 High schools in Oklahoma
 Private schools in Oklahoma
 Colleges and universities in Oklahoma
 University of Tulsa
 University of Oklahoma
 Oklahoma State University

See also

Topic overview:
Oklahoma

Index of Oklahoma-related articles

References

External links 

Oklahoma
Oklahoma